Paramount Global Content Distribution is the international television distribution arm of American media conglomerate, Paramount Global, originally established in 1962 as the international distribution division of Desilu Productions. With the sale of Desilu to Gulf+Western, then-owners of film studio Paramount Pictures, in 1968, the division evolved into Paramount's first foray into the international television industry in the 1970s.

The division handles the distribution of television content from the libraries of Paramount Media Networks, Paramount Television Studios, CBS Studios, CBS Media Ventures, Showtime Networks and Paramount+.

History
The division as well as Paramount International Television was originally established in 1962 as the international distribution division of Desilu Productions, Desilu International, which was managed by Bruce Gordon. The company co-produced The Lost Islands with the Ten Network (now Network 10) in 1975. Network 10 and this division have been in common ownership since 2019 after the Viacom/CBS merger. In 1983, it acquired distribution rights to the Australian miniseries, Return to Eden.In 1968, Desilu was sold to Gulf+Western, the then-owners of film studio Paramount Pictures, eventually adding international television to its well known film operations. Gulf+Western rebranded the division as Paramount Television International to handle international sales of Desilu/Paramount properties from Paramount Television.

In 1981, CBS launched its international division, CBS Broadcast International, to sell news, sports and entertainment programing produced in-house to foreign markets as well as non-broadcast and new technology markets in the U.S. It eventually merged into CBS Worldwide Enterprises and later merged into its marketing unit CBS Productions (unrelated to the later company of the same name) with CBS Theatrical Films on 17 December 1984. In the summer of 1985, CBS Productions, CBS News and Columbia House partnered to produce a videocassette The Vietnam War with Walter Cronkite.

Later that year, CBS shut down its theatrical production unit and CBS Broadcast International spun-out from the production unit, restoring the CBS Broadcast International moniker in the process. It planned to provide the CBS Evening News bulletins to UK-based British Satellite Broadcasting in 1988.

CBS Broadcast International produced syndicated episodes of the TV series, The Twilight Zone in 1985. It then signed a partnership agreement with MGM/UA Telecommunications 2 years later to syndicate its episodes from all 2 seasons with the addition of 30 new first-run episodes in order to form a 90-episode syndication package. On 28 October that same year, CBS Broadcast International announced its acquisition of TV and ancillary market rights to four Academy Award/Oscar-winning films produced by Arthur Cohn such as Dangerous Moves, Black and White in Color, The Garden of the Finzi Continis and The Sky Above, The Mud Below. It also announced plans to pick up the bulletins of CBS Evening News with Dan Rather which would place it on a tape-delayed basis on international channel Tele Monte Carlo.

In 1986, CBS Broadcast International has a partnership that they will exploit the rights to the Madison Square Garden properties. In 1987, the company, along with MCA TV International, had inked an agreement with China Central Television (CCTV), to offer a total of 100 drama hours, which combined, represent the largest license to date, and making it the two Hollywood studios the largest suppliers for foreign producers on Chinese TV. In 1990, it was considered as an investor in the Nine Television Network.

In 1995, CBS Broadcast International launched a joint venture to be headed by Peter Press. In 1998, James Dowaliby was tapped to be vice president of production and Christopher Ottinger was named vice president of business development at the division. Later that year, Paramount has plans to sign for an international co-production.

CBS Broadcast International launched a global programming alliance with Virgin Media Television in 1997. That following year, Stephanie Pacheco was named the managing director of international sales of the division.

In 2000, the division was touted to develop and co-produce Jeremiah with Lionsgate, but got replaced by MGM.

CBS Broadcast International and Paramount International Television merged on 11 August 2004 to create 'CBS Paramount International Television and would be headed by Armando Nuarez Jr. The division was transferred to CBS Corporation after CBS spun-off from Viacom at the beginning of 2006, with television rights to the films from its sister company, Paramount Pictures, obtained by Trifecta Entertainment and Media. With the 4 December 2019 merger of CBS and Viacom the TV rights to Paramount's films were brought back to the now-combined ViacomCBS.

The company distributes television content from the libraries of CBS Studios, the King World Productions and certain HBO shows internationally the Rysher Entertainment library, the latter owned domestically by 2929 Entertainment. In May 2009, CPITV was renamed CBS Studios International. On 14 September that year, CBS Studios International struck a joint venture deal with Chellomedia to launch six CBS-branded channels in the UK which would replace Zone Romantica, Zone Thriller, Zone Horror and Zone Reality, plus timeshift services Zone Horror +1 and Zone Reality +1. The replacement channels launched on 16 November that year. On 5 April 2010, Zone Horror and Zone Horror +1 were rebranded as Horror Channel and Horror Channel +1 respectively.

CBS Studios International licensed rights for the top international formats. In 2010, CBS Studios International went into an equal joint venture with Reliance Broadcast Network Limited to form Big CBS Networks Pvt. Ltd. At the time, the network operated 3 main channels; Big CBS Prime, a general entertainment channel, Big CBS Spark, a youth-oriented channel and Big CBS Love, a women's and urban couple-oriented channel.

In January 2011, CBS Studios International partnered with Australian company, Ten Network Holdings, to launch digital free-to-air channel known as Eleven and would hold a 33% stake in its joint-venture holding company, ElevenCo. Ten Network Holdings entered voluntary administration in June 2017 which ultimately led to CBS acquiring the entirety of the company that November.

On 1 August 2012, Chellomedia revealed that the European versions of Zone Romantica, Zone Reality and Club would be rebranded respeectively as CBS Drama, CBS Reality and CBS Action.

Following the December 4, 2019 merger of CBS and Viacom to create ViacomCBS, CBS Studios International and Viacom International Studios merged and rebranded to ViacomCBS Global Distribution Group. On February 16, 2022, ViacomCBS rebranded as Paramount Global, rebranding the division likewise to its current name and restoring the "Paramount" name for the first time in 17 years.

Past activities
Viacom International Inc. established in 1971, just a year after Viacom spun-out from the CBS TV network and it became Viacom's parent company. The company is responsible for copyrights and trademarks associated with its corporate websites, applications and cable networks, specifically its Media Networks division. The division also licenses the product rights for their various properties and the dissemination of visual and textual television programs on a subscription/fee basis.

Viacom International also served as the licensee name and division for its group of television stations for FCC purposes before the 1999 Westinghouse/CBS merger. Former Viacom station WVIT in New Britain, Connecticut (serving Hartford and New Haven), which it owned from 1978 until 1997, took its call letters from the initials of Viacom International, and retains them to the present day under NBC ownership.

The Viacom International name continued to be used following Viacom and CBS' merger on December 4, 2019 to create ViacomCBS, and ViacomCBS' rebrand as the current Paramount Global in 2022.

As CBS Paramount International Television, the division distributed films/movies from the libraries of Paramount Pictures and the Republic Pictures between 2006 and 2009, as well as DreamWorks Pictures from 2006 to 2008.

As CBS Studios International, the division had 50% ownership of former Australian pay-TV channels, TV1 and SF Channel. In 2013, RTL Group and CBS Studios International announced a joint venture called RTL CBS Asia Entertainment Network for Southeast Asia  with the launch of RTL CBS Entertainment in September that year, but would be acquired 5 years later in January by Blue Ant Media.

The division previously owned all CBS-branded European TV channels in a joint venture with AMC Networks International and Australian television company, Ten Network Holdings. Both have since been transferred to the main international networks division of Paramount Global.

See also
 CBS Studios
 MTV Entertainment Studios
 Paramount Television Studios

References

External links
 

Paramount Global divisions
Mass media companies established in 1962
Television production companies of the United States
Television syndication distributors